Chanelle Peloso (born January 21, 1994) is a Canadian television actress known for her role as Hailey Yarner in The Bletchley Circle: San Francisco, for which she received a Canadian Screen Award nomination for Best Supporting Actress in a Drama Series at the 7th Canadian Screen Awards in 2019.

Career 
Peloso began her career on Disney Channel films and series, including Radio Rebel and Zapped, along with roles on Cartoon Network series including Level Up and Incredible Crew.

In that same year, she starred as Petra Smith in the Netflix original series Another Life. She also voices the recurring character Romy in Barbie and the Secret Door and Potion Nova in My Little Pony: Pony Life, which premiered on June 21, 2020.

Personal life 
In 2021, Peloso became engaged to Kate Harquail, a musician and producer.

Filmography

Film

Television

References

External links

1994 births
Canadian television actresses
Living people
Canadian lesbian actresses
21st-century Canadian actresses
Place of birth missing (living people)
21st-century Canadian LGBT people